Big Cub Creek is a stream in the U.S. state of West Virginia.

Big Cub Creek was named for the fact bear cubs were seen there by a settler.

See also
List of rivers of West Virginia

References

Rivers of Wyoming County, West Virginia
Rivers of West Virginia